Dafydd Elystan Elystan-Morgan, Baron Elystan-Morgan (7 December 1932 – 7 July 2021), known as Elystan Morgan, was a Welsh politician. He sat as a crossbencher in the House of Lords from 1981 to 2020, and served as a Labour MP from 1966 to 1974.

Early life 
Morgan was educated at Ardwyn Grammar School, Aberystwyth, and became a member of Plaid Cymru as a schoolboy in 1946. He studied law at the University College of Wales, Aberystwyth, where he was involved with student politics and served as president of the debating union. He qualified as a solicitor and joined a legal firm in Wrexham.

Political career 
Early in 1955, Morgan was adopted as Plaid Cymru candidate for the Wrexham constituency and contested the seat at the by-election in 1955, and at the general elections in 1955 and in 1959. In 1964 he was selected to succeed the party president Gwynfor Evans as candidate for Merioneth.

Morgan joined the Labour Party and was elected Member of Parliament (MP) for Cardiganshire, Wales, at the 1966 general election, and served as a junior minister from 1968 to 1970, as Under-Secretary at the Home Office. He was chairman of the Welsh Parliamentary Labour Party between 1971 and 1974. He campaigned heavily for Welsh devolution, as he believed that Wales should not legally be seen as a part of England. He believed that Cardiff should have all major governing powers over Wales, save for a few, such as the ability to go to war. In the February 1974 general election, Morgan lost his seat to Liberal candidate Geraint Howells.

In 1979, he sought election as Labour candidate for Anglesey, following the retirement of Cledwyn Hughes, but was defeated by Conservative candidate Keith Best. Following his defeat, he largely withdrew from political life and concentrated on his legal career.

He was admitted to Gray's Inn in 1971, entitled to practise as a barrister. He was created a life peer on 27 May 1981, with the title Baron Elystan-Morgan, of Aberteifi in the County of Dyfed. He held the office of Recorder between 1983 and 1987. Morgan held the office of Circuit Judge between 1987 and 2003. He did, however, return to politics after his retirement in 2006. He was President of the Aberystwyth Old Students' Association in 1995–96.

On 6 March 2007, Morgan supported the abolition of the blasphemy law in the UK, quoting Richard Dawkins's description of God as "a petty, unjust, unforgiving control freak; a vindictive, bloodthirsty ethnic cleanser; a misogynistic, homophobic, racist, infanticidal, genocidal, filicidal, pestilential, megalomaniacal, sadomasochistic, capriciously malevolent bully". A deacon in the Presbyterian Church of Wales at Capel-y-Garn in Pen-y-garn, he was making the point that God did not need the protection of the law.

He retired from the House of Lords on 12 February 2020.

Personal life 
In 1959, Morgan married Alwen Roberts. They had two children, a daughter called Eleri (born 1960) and a son, Owain (born 1962). Lady Elystan-Morgan died in 2006.

Morgan died on 7 July 2021 at the age of 88.

Works

References

Sources

External links 

1932 births
2021 deaths
Alumni of Aberystwyth University
Crossbench life peers
Labour Party (UK) life peers
Members of the Parliament of the United Kingdom for Ceredigion
Ministers in the Wilson governments, 1964–1970
Ordained peers
People educated at Ardwyn School, Aberystwyth
People from Aberystwyth
Aberystwyth Old Students' Association
Plaid Cymru parliamentary candidates
UK MPs 1966–1970
UK MPs 1970–1974
Welsh Labour Party MPs
Welsh Presbyterians
Life peers created by Elizabeth II